Edward Herrera (born 14 November 1986) is a Maltese footballer who plays for Maltese Premier League side Żejtun Corinthians where he plays mainly as a wing back.

International career 

Herrera made his international debut for Malta on 18 November 2009, in the 1–4 home friendly defeat against Bulgaria. He came on as a substitute, replacing Kevin Sammut in the 56th minute. On 10 September 2013, Herrera scored his first international goal in the 1–2 defeat against Bulgaria in a 2014 FIFA World Cup qualifier.

Honours 

Hibernians
 Maltese Premier League (1): 2008–09
 Maltese FA Trophy (1): 2011–12

Birkirkara
 Maltese Premier League (1): 2012–13
 Maltese FA Trophy (1): 2014–15
 Maltese Super Cup (2): 2012–13, 2013–14

Floriana
 Maltese Premier League (1): 2019–20

References

External links 
 
 
 Profile on Floriana's website

1986 births
Living people
Maltese footballers
Malta international footballers
Melita F.C. players
Pietà Hotspurs F.C. players
Hibernians F.C. players
Birkirkara F.C. players
Floriana F.C. players
Sirens F.C. players
People from Pietà, Malta
Maltese Premier League players
Association football fullbacks